The Minnesela Bridge is a historic bridge located in Butte County, South Dakota. It was built in 1917 and was listed on the National Register of Historic Places in 1993 as part of the Historic Bridges in South Dakota Multiple Property Submission. It was one of the earliest concrete bridges constructed in the state. Concrete Engineering Company built multiple concrete bridges in the Rapid City area in the late 1910s, and due to the quality of their construction, many have survived. The bride was built at a cost of $2,588. Its common name is in reference to the nearby site of the ghost town of Minnesela, which sits just a few feet east of the bridge.

Architecture
Concrete Engineering Company designed it in a vernacular style. The arch is a segmental barrel arch with filled spandrels and recessed panels. It has a balustrade along the bridge and wing walls which "appears as crenelation pierced by semi-circular arches." The guardrails have decorative castellated beams.

References

Bridges completed in 1917
National Register of Historic Places in Butte County, South Dakota
Road bridges on the National Register of Historic Places in South Dakota
1917 establishments in South Dakota